The National Film Awards is the most prominent and prestigious award of Nepali cinema. The first National Film Award was held in 2005, in the presence of His Majesty's King Gyanendra Bir Bikram Shah. The event is held at the residence of the president of Nepal and the president (as a Head of Nation) gives the awards to the winners in various categories. It is yearly organised by Film Development Board, Nepal (government organisation, which looks after film industry of Nepal).

National Film Awards 2005 (2062 BS)

The Film Development Board of Nepal organized the National Film Awards 2005 at Birendra International Convention Center, Kathmandu, Nepal. The award's nomination was declared in the presence of His Majesty's Queen Komal Rajya Laxmi Devi Shah.

Winners of the awards:

 Best National Language Film: Kab Hoi Milanwa Hamaar
 Best Story: Naru Thapa for Bandhaki
 Best Script: Prithvi Rana for Pareni Maya Jaalai Ma
 Best Dailog: Yugesh Rayamaji for Bandhaki
Best Child Artist Sushmita Regmi for Pahuna
Best Re-Recording: Mukesh Shah for Bandhaki
 Best Editor: Banish Shah for Bandhaki
Best Dance Director: A. Kamal Rai for Bandhaki and B. Birendra Hamal for Agnipath
Best Vocal Female: Sapana Shree for Dharmatmaa
Best Vocal Male: Prakash Shrestha for Bacha Bandhan (Song Title: Jaba Maile...)
Best Lyricist: Suresh Adhikari for Muglan
Best Art Direction: Nirjal Shrestha for Bir GaneshMan
Best Fight Direction: N.B. Maharjan for Bandhaki
Best Debut Actress: Gita Shahi for Bandhaki
Best Debut Actor: Bhupendra Chand for Dui Kinara
Best Music Director: Suresh Adhikari for Bandhaki
Best Cinematographer: Dirgha Bir Gurung for Jeevan Rekha
Best Supporting Actor (Female): Mithila Sharma for Karmayodhha
Best Supporting Actor (Male): Mukunda Shrestha for Kartavya
Best Comedy Actor: Kiran KC for Meri Aama
Best Actor in Negative Role: Dilip Rayamajhi for Baaji
Best Actress : Jal Shah for Yastai Rahecha Zindagi
Best Actor: Nikhil Uprety for Hami Teen Bhai
Best Director: Kishor Rana Magar for Bandhaki
Best Film : Bandhaki for Radhe Krishna Films Pvt. Ltd. (Daktar SIngh Gurung)
Critics Award: Mala Sinha for Maitighar
Film Excellence Honor of Nepal for Dev Anand, Indian Actor, Director

The films and winners were selected from the films released in the year 2004 (2061 BS).

National Film Awards 2006 (2063 BS)

The Film Development Board of Nepal organized the National Film Awards 2006 in Rastriya Nach Ghar, Kantipath, Kathmandu. on 16th Asadh 2067, on the occasion of Anniversary Day of Film Development Board, Nepal.

Winners of the awards:

 Best Cinematographer: Dirgha Bir Gurung for Bharosa
Best Actor (Female) : Rekha Thapa for Himmat
Best Actor (Male) : Bhuwan KC for Duniya
Best Director: Shiva Regmi for Duniya
Special Approach in Film Production A: Alpabiram 
Special Approach in Film Production B: Jhankri
Best Actor (Appreciable Acting): Rama Thapaliya for Alpabiram

National Film Awards 2008 (2065 BS)

The Film Development Board of Nepal organized the National Film Awards 2008 Kathmandu.

Winners of the awards:

 Best Film: Jana Yuddha
 Best Director: Ujwal Ghimire for Kishmat
 Best Actor: Aakash Adhikari for Jana Yuddha
 Best Actress: Rekha Thapa for Kishmat
 Best Actor in Supporting Role: Rajesh Hamal for Maryadaa
 Best Actress in Supporting Role: Tara K.C for Jana Yuddha
 Best Editor: Banish Shah for Jana Yuddha
 Best Cinematographer: Raju Bikram Thapa for Darr

 Best Actress for Indigenous movie: Melina Manandhar for Balamaiju
 Best Actor for Indigenous movie: Tej Bahadur Tamang 

The films and winners were selected from the films released in the year 2006 (2063 BS).

National Film Awards 2008 (2065 BS)

The National Film Award 2008 (2065) was distributed on 1 July 2008. The awards were handed over by the then prime minister Pushpa Kamal Dahal (Prachanda) with legendary Indian actor Mala Sinha. The award was organized by the Film Development Board of Nepal. Janayudha was chosen as the best film and Ujwal Ghimire was awarded as best film director of the year for his film Kismat.

National Film Awards 2010 (2067 BS)

The Film Development Board of Nepal organized the National Film Awards 2010 after a gap of three years at Rashtriya Naachghar, Kathmandu.

Winners of the awards:

 Lifetime Achievement Award: Uddhab Poudel
 Best Film: Chodi Gaye Paap Lagla
 Best Director: Ujwal Ghimire for Chodi Gaye Paap Lagla
 Best Actor: Anup Baral for Dasdhunga
 Best Actress: Sanchita Luitel for Chodi Gaye Paap Lagla
 Best Actor in Supporting Role: Dayahang Rai for Dasdhunga
 Best Actress in Supporting Role: Srijana Basnet for Sangharsa Jindagi Ko
 Best Writer: Krishnahari Baral for Hifajat
 Best Editor: Nimesh Shrestha for Dasdhunga
 Best Sound mixing: Uttam Neupane for Mero Euta Saathi Chha
 Best Cinematographer: Deepak Bajhracharya for Chodi Gaye Paap Lagla
 Best Indigenous Film: Balamaiju (Newari language film)

The films and winners were selected from the films released in the year 2009 (2066 BS).

National Film Awards 2011 (2068 BS)

The Film Development Board of Nepal organized the National Film Awards 2011 at Shital Niwas, Kathmandu, where President Ram Baran Yadav presented the awards. Ujwal Ghimire won the best director national award 2011 for his film Andaj. Tara Bahadur Thapa (Kimvhey) won the best Editor National Film Award 2011 for his film "Desh". Yash Kumar won the best National playback singer Award 2011 from the movie Bato Muniko Phool

National Film Awards 2012 (2069 BS)

The Film Development Board of Nepal organized the National Film Awards 2012  Kathmandu.
Winners of the awards:

 Best Film: Notebook
 Best Director: Dinesh DC for Mayas Bar
 Best Actor: Wilson Bikram Rai for Ridam
 Best Actress: Jharana Thapa for Notebook
 Best Writer: Dev Nepal for Mero Katha
 Best Editor: Banish Shah for Notebook
 Best Cinematographer: Purusottyam Pradhan for Vijilaante 3D

The films and winners were selected from the films released in the year 2011 (2068 BS).

National Film Awards 2013
The Film Development Board of Nepal organized the National Film Awards 2014.The films and winners were selected from the films released in the year 2013.

 Lifetime Achievement Award: Yadav Kharel

 Best Movie: Sanghuro

 Best Director: Dipa Basnet for Antaraal

 Best Actor in a Leading Role (Male): Sushank Mainali for Sanghuro

 Best Actor in a Leading Role (Female): Garima Panta for Jhola

 Best Cinematographer: Gauri Shankar Dhunju for Shirish Ko Phul

 Best Editor: Lokesh Bajracharya for  Karkash

 Best Writer: Binod Paudel for Sanghuro

 Best Music Director: Basanta Sapkota for Nai Nabhannu La 2

 Best Lyricist: Dr. Krishna Hari Baral for Nai Nabhannu La 2

 Best Indigenous Movie: Kusum

National Film Awards 2014 (2070 BS)
The films and winners were selected from the films released in the year 2014.
Winners of the awards:

 Best Film: Jhola
 Best Director: Yadav Kumar Bhattarai for Jhola
 Best Actor: Aaryan Sigdel for Mahashush
 Best Actress: Garima Panta for Jhola
 Best Actor (Supporting): Ramesh Budhathoki for Raajneeti
 Best Actress (Supporting): Laxmi Giri for Jhola
 Best Actor (Debut): Gaurav Pahari for Manjari
 Best Actress (Debut): Sujata Koirala for Manjari
 Best Writer: Hemraj B.C. for Hostel (2013 film)
 Best Editor: Badri Lamichhane for Mahashush
 Best Cinematographer: Purusottam Pradhan for Nai Nabhannu La 2
 Best Documentary Editor: Lawa Pyakurel for Nijamati: Under Fire
 Best Documentary Film: Nijamati: Under Fire

National Film Awards 2015 (2071 BS)

The Film Development Board of Nepal organized the National Film Awards 2015 at Shital Niwas, Kathmandu, where President Ram Baran Yadav presented the awards.

Winners of the awards:

 Lifetime Achievement Award: Neer Shah
 Best Film: Kabbadi
 Best Actor: Dayahang Rai for Sambodhan
 Best Actress: Reecha Sharma for Talakjung vs Tulke and Sangam Bista for Love You Baba
 Best Director: Nischal Basnet for Talakjung vs Tulke
 Best Writer: Ram Babu Gurung and Upendra Subba for Kabbadi
 Best Editor: Nimesh Shrestha for Zhigrana
 Best Cinematographer: Shailendra Dhoj Karki for Zhigrana
 Best Indigenous Film: Matan

Out of the 87 films released in 2014 (2071 BS), 60 were considered for award nomination. The jury members were Karishma Manandhar, Rajendra Shalav, Kapil Parajuli, Hemanta Budhathoki and Dipendra Lama.

National Film Awards 2016 (2072 BS)

The Film Development Board of Nepal organized the National Film Awards 2016 at Shital Niwas, Kathmandu. President Bidhya Devi Bhandari presented the awards.

Winners of the awards:

 Lifetime Achievement Award: Basundhara Bhusal
 Best Film: Pashupati Prasad
 Best Actor: Dayahang Rai for Kabaddi Kabaddi
 Best Actress: Namrata Shrestha for Classic
 Best Director: Dipendra K Khanal for Pashupati Prasad
 Best Writer: Khagendra Lamichhane for Pashupati Prasad
 Best Editor: Surendra Poudel for Classic
 Best Cinematographer: Pursottam Pradhan and Sanjay Lama for Dreams
 Best Indigenous Film: Yumpo Deurali (Gurung language film)

The decisions for the awards were made by a committee led by Ramesh Budhathoki. The members of the committee were Laya Sangarula, Sarita Lamichhane, Mohan Niraula, Sushil Poudel and Karun Thapa. The films and winners were selected from the films released in the year 2015 (2072 BS).

National Film Award 2017(2073 BS)
Winners of the awards:

 Lifetime Achievement Award: Shubhadra Adhikari
 Best Film: Kalo Pothi
 Best Actor: Bipin Karki for Jatra
 Best Actress: Srijana Subba for Dying Candle
 Best Director: Deepak Rauniyar for Seto Surya | White Sun
 Best Writer: Min Bahadur Bam  and Avinash Bikara Shah for Kalo Pothi
 Best Editor: Mitra Dev Gurung    for Jatra
 Best Documentary Cinematographer: Oma Karki for Katha Nalapaniko
 Best Cinematographer: Shiva Ram Shrestha  for Love Sasha
 Best Indigenous Film: Bhedi Gothalo
 Popular Film : Chakka Panja

National Film Award 2018(2074 BS)
Winners of the awards:

 Lifetime Achievement Award: Kishor Rana Magar
 Best Film: Blind Rocks
 Best Actor: Puspa Khadka for Mangalam
 Best Actress: Benisha Hamal for Blind Rocks
 Best Director: Milan Chamling Rai for Blind Rocks
 Best Writer: Khagendra Lamichhane for Dhanapati
 Best Editor: Mitra Dev Gurung    for Mangalam
 Best Cinematographer: Purusottam Pradhan for Kri
 Best Indigenous Film:  Sherpa Language

National Film Award 2019(2075 BS)
Winners of the awards:

 Lifetime Achievement Award: Tulsi Ghimire
 Best Film: Gopi
 Best Actor: Bipin Karki for Prasad
 Best Actress: Swastima Khadka for Bulbul
 Best Director: Binod Poudel for Bulbul
 Best Writer: Dipendra Lama and Shamipyaraj Timilsina for Gopi
 Best Editor: Nimesh Shrestha    for Saili
 Best Cinematographer: Sanjaya Lama for Summer Love
 Best Indigenous Film: Rije Naya

References

Nepali film awards
Annual events in Nepal
2005 establishments in Nepal